Garda may refer to:

 Police, known as Garda in Hiberno-English
 GardaWorld, a security and protection company headquartered in Montreal, Canada
 Garda Síochána, the national police of the Republic of Ireland
 Garda National Surveillance Unit, the domestic intelligence agency of the Republic of Ireland
 Garda (VR), a commune on the shores of the Italian Lake Garda in the province of Verona
 Garda, Gotland, alternative name for Garde, a settlement on the Swedish island of Gotland
 Garda Financiară, a former Romanian control and tax law-enforcement agency
 Garda hitch, a knot used in rock climbing and rescue
 Lake Garda, a lake in northern Italy

See also 
 Gârda (disambiguation)
 Garde (disambiguation)
 Guarda (disambiguation)
 Guardia (disambiguation)
 Guard (disambiguation)